"The Ransom of Red Chief" is a short story by O. Henry first published in the July 6, 1907, issue of The Saturday Evening Post. It follows two men who kidnap and demand a ransom for a wealthy Alabamian's son. Eventually, the men are driven crazy by the boy's spoiled and hyperactive behavior, and they pay the boy's father to take him back.

The story and its main idea have become a part of popular culture, with many children's television programs depicting versions of the story as one of their episodes. It has also been often used as a classic example of two ultimate comic ironiesa supposed "hostage" actually liking his abductors and enjoying being captured, and his captors getting their just deserts by having the tables turned on them, and being compelled to pay to be rid of him.

Summary

Two small-time criminals, Bill and Sam Driskoll, kidnap a kid named Johnny, the 10-year-old red-haired son of Ebenezer Dorset, an important citizen, and hold him for ransom. But the moment that they arrive at their hideout with the boy, the plan begins to unravel, as the boy actually starts to enjoy his kidnappers. Calling himself "Red Chief", the boy proceeds to drive his captors to distraction with his unrelenting chatter, malicious pranks, and demands that they play wearying games with him, such as riding 90 miles on Bill's back pretending to be an Indian scout. The criminals write a ransom letter to the boy's father, lowering the ransom from $2,000 to $1,500, believing that the father won't pay much money for his return. The father, who knows his son well and realizes how intolerable he will be to his captors and how eager they will soon be to rid themselves of the delinquent child, rejects their demand and offers to take the boy off their hands if they pay him $250. The men hand over the money and the howling boywho had actually been happier being away from his strict fatherand flee while the father restrains his son from following them. The ironic situation lies in the fact that the kidnappers have to pay the father to get his son back (or in truth, to actually agree to even accept him back) instead of the father's paying the kidnappers for the return of his son.

Influence

"The Ransom of Red Chief" has been adapted many times, directly and indirectly. Direct adaptations include the 1952 movie The Ransom of Red Chief starring Fred Allen and Oscar Levant (part of O. Henry's Full House), the segment "The Ransom of Red Chief" in the 1962 Soviet black-and-white comedy film Strictly Business by Leonid Gaidai,  the 1977 "The Ransom of Red Chief" episode of the ABC Weekend Special series, the 1984 opera Ransom of Red Chief (libretto, music, and orchestration by Brad Liebl), and the 1998 television film The Ransom of Red Chief; there is also Le Grand Chef, a French direct adaptation made in 1959 by Henri Verneuil, with Fernandel and Gino Cervi.

Indirect adaptions include the 1929 Japanese silent comedy Straightforward Boy by Yasujirō Ozu, the British film Don't Ever Leave Me (1949) played with a girl instead, with Petula Clark in the role, the episode "The Ransom of Red Chimp" of the 1990s Disney animated series TaleSpin, the 1985 Soviet animated short , the films Too Many Crooks (1959) and Ruthless People (1986) (which take the story a step further), and "The Ransom of Rusty Rex", a segment of the 2015 anthology film Tales of Halloween. A 2015 episode of the radio comedy anthology Stanley Baxter's Playhouse, titled "Two Desperate Men" after how the kidnappers sign their note, relocated the story to rural Scotland in the 1930s.

References

External links
 
 Full audio dramatization also available free from WOUB Public Media (Athens, Ohio) online here.

1907 short stories
1900s short stories
American short stories
Short stories by O. Henry
Works originally published in The Saturday Evening Post
Short stories adapted into films